The 1971–72 Buffalo Sabres season was the Buffalo Sabres second season of operation in the National Hockey League (NHL).

Offseason 
An $8.7 million (approximately $ in  dollars) renovation took place after the 1970–71 inauguration of the Sabres and Buffalo Braves franchises. The arena's roof was raised 24 feet, making room for a new upper level. This raised the total capacity of the arena to over 17,000 for basketball and 15,858 for hockey, making it a more suitable home for the NBA and NHL.

Regular season 
For the second consecutive season the Sabres had a breakout rookie performance by their first round draft pick. Rick Martin would score 44 goals breaking the NHL rookie scoring record of 38 set the previous season by Gilbert Perreault. Despite the efforts of their young phenoms the Sabres would finish with a worse record than their inaugural season and again miss the Playoffs. During the season Eddie Shack was traded to Pittsburgh for Rene Robert.

Final standings

Schedule and results

Playoffs 
The Sabres failed to make the playoffs in the 1971–72 season.

Player statistics

Regular season 
Scoring

Goaltending

Awards and records 
The Sabres were not awarded any individual or team awards in the 1971–72 season.

Transactions

Intra-League Draft

Reverse Draft

Free Agency

Lost via retirement

Draft picks

NHL draft

Farm teams 
For the 1971–72 season Buffalo's AHL farm team was the Cincinnati Swords. In the team's inaugural season they would post a 30–28–18 record placing 3rd in the West Division which would secure a playoff berth. The first round brought the 2nd seed Hershey Bears who were swept. In the second round the Swords faced off against the 1st seed Baltimore Clippers losing the series 4–2.

See also 
 1971–72 NHL season

References 

Buffalo Sabres seasons
Buff
Buff
Buffalo
Buffalo